FK Miravci is a football club based in the village Miravci near Gevgelija, Republic of North Macedonia. They was recently played in the Macedonian Second League.

History

The club was founded in 1951.

In the 2010–11 season, they finished 4th in the Macedonian Second League and won promotion to the Macedonian First League by beating FK Skopje 4–1 in a promotion playoff game. Later, the club gave up that spot after a fusion with FK Vardar and went back to playing in the Macedonian Second League for the 2011–12 season.

References

External links
Club info at MacedonianFootball 
Football Federation of Macedonia 

Miravci
Association football clubs established in 1951
1951 establishments in the Socialist Republic of Macedonia
Gevgelija Municipality